The Bockberg is a hill, near Königshütte in Harz district in the Harz mountains of central Germany. Since 1967 the hill and its surrounding area have been protected as a nature reserve.

The Bockberg rises immediately north of a loop in the B 27 federal road at the village of Neue Hütte. On its southwestern slopes, part of a volcano, formed in the Devonian sea, can be seen. Rubble from keratophyre lava in a white, potash matrix, has built a volcanic breccia here, which contains veins of hematite.

The plateau of the Bockberg is extensively karstified. Many rare flowers thrive on the fields of yellow oat-grass and semi-dry pasture, including the globe flower.

References 

Mountains and hills of Saxony-Anhalt
Hills of the Harz
Nature reserves in Saxony-Anhalt